PLK may refer to:

 PLK (rapper) (born 1997), French rapper of Polish and Corsican origin 
 PKP PLK, a Polish railroad company
 PLK Vicwood KT Chong Sixth Form College
 Polska Liga Koszykówki, Polish Basketball League
 Pulkovo Airlines, ICAO airline designator
 M. Graham Clark Downtown Airport, Missouri, USA, IATA code
 Po Leung Kuk, a Hong Kong charitable organisation
 Polo-like kinase, regulators of the cell cycle (mitosis)

See also
 Polo-like kinase 1, an enzyme encoded by the PLK1 gene